Fateh Mohammad Malik, ( ALA-LC: born 1936) is a Pakistani literary critic, linguist and a scholar. He has authored several books including an essay "Iqbal Inspired Humour: A Note on Parodies by Selected Urdu Poets" published in Of Clowns and Gods, Brahmans and Babus - Humour in South Asian Literatures.

Iqbal had a key influence on him and he wrote at least six books on him including his book Iqbal's reconstruction of Muslim political thought published by University of Leicester, England. His major work while working for National Language Authority was a five-volume book on the origin of Urdu as a language.

Career

Malik is the chairman of the National Language Authority. He served as Rector of the International Islamic University, Islamabad until 2012 when he was sacked by then President Zardari under pressureof from the Saudi government. Before being sacked from his post, he criticized Saudi Arabia's practices as uncivilized and anti-women during a seminar.

He also served this university as a dean of the faculty of languages, literature and humanities.

Before starting his career in Pakistan, he taught at Columbia University, Heidelberg University, Humboldt University and Saint Petersburg University for ten years.

Awards and recognition
Sitara-i-Imtiaz Award (Star of Excellence) by the President of Pakistan in 2006

References

1936 births
Living people
Academic staff of the International Islamic University, Islamabad
Pakistani literary critics
Linguists of Urdu
Recipients of Sitara-i-Imtiaz